Agostino Folignatti or Agostino Molignatus (died 1579) was a Roman Catholic prelate who served as Bishop of Bertinoro (1564–1579)
and Bishop of Trevico (1562–1564).

Biography
On 27 May 1562, Agostino Folignatti was appointed during the papacy of Pope Pius IV as Bishop of Trevico.
On 28 July 1564, Agostino Folignatti was appointed during the papacy of Pope Pius IV as Bishop of Bertinoro.
He served as Bishop of Bertinoro until his death in 1579.

References

External links and additional sources
 (non-Latin listing of Chronology of Bishops) 
 (non-Latin listing of Chronology of Bishops)  
 (non-Latin listing of Chronology of Bishops) 
 (non-Latin listing of Chronology of Bishops) 

16th-century Italian Roman Catholic bishops
Bishops appointed by Pope Pius IV
1579 deaths